Saint-Martin-du-Tertre is a commune in the Yonne department in Bourgogne-Franche-Comté in north-central France. It is situated on the left bank of the river Yonne, 2 km northwest of Sens.

See also
Communes of the Yonne department

References

Communes of Yonne